Braschi may refer to:

Braschi family, an Italian noble family
Giannina Braschi, American poet
Nicoletta Braschi, Italian actress
Gianluigi Braschi, Italian film producer
Rómulo Antonio Braschi,  Argentine Independent Catholic bishop,
Luigi Braschi Onesti, nephew of Pope Pius VI, from 1787 and 1795 he built Palazzo Braschi at Terracina (a private residence for his uncle)
Romoaldo Braschi-Onesti, nephew of Pope Pius VI and Camerlengo of the Holy Roman Church from 1800 to 1801.

See also 
 31605 Braschi
 Palazzo Braschi